Stuyvesant station, also known as Stuyvesant Landing Depot, is a historic train station located in Stuyvesant, Columbia County, New York.  It was built during the second half of 1880 after the original station was destroyed by a fire.  Mull & Fromer, Masons and Builders, of Catskill, New York, secured the contract to rebuild the station and E. Lampman was their carpenter.

The station is a five bay brick building, 50 feet long and 20 feet wide, with a hipped roof.  It features a molded and ornamented cornice and curved canopy. It was used along New York Central Railroad's Water Level Route and ceased to be used as a station in 1958.  A local farmers market is held at the station.

It was listed on the National Register of Historic Places in 1999 as Stuyvesant Railroad Station.

References

Railway stations in the United States opened in 1880
Italianate architecture in New York (state)
Railway stations on the National Register of Historic Places in New York (state)
Railway stations in Columbia County, New York
Former New York Central Railroad stations
National Register of Historic Places in Columbia County, New York
Former railway stations in New York (state)